Mount Lanzerotti is the northernmost of the Sky-Hi Nunataks, rising to about  in Palmer Land, Antarctica. It was named by the Advisory Committee on Antarctic Names in 1987 after Louis J. Lanzerotti, of Bell Laboratories, Murray Hill, New Jersey, principal investigator for upper atmosphere research at Siple Station and South Pole Station for many years from 1970. Lanzerotti was a member of the Polar Research Board at the National Academy of Sciences, 1982–90, and was Chairman of the Committee on Antarctic Policy and Science, 1992–93.

References

Mountains of Palmer Land